Alaric is a masculine Germanic given name that, broken into its parts means Ala "everyone's" and ric "ruler". This has various forms in the several Germanic languages, such as Alareiks in the original Gothic and Alrekr in Old Norse. Most modern Germanic languages render it as Alarich or Alarik but Alaric is the form used in modern English, an adaptation of the Latinization (Alaricus) of the Gothic one—there is also the alternative Latinization Alarichus from Greek Ἀλάριχος --. In Italian, Galician, Portuguese, and Spanish it is Alarico.

Kings
There were two Visigothic kings with this name:

Alaric I, who reigned from 395–410, prominent for the Sack of Rome in 410
Alaric II, who reigned from 485–507
There was a legendary king of Sweden named Alaric.

Others
 Alaric B. Chapin (June 18, 1848–November 27, 1924), Union Army soldier who received the Medal of Honor for gallantry in the American Civil War
 Alaric Hall (born 1979), British medievalist
 Alaric Jacob, British journalist, most active in the period 1940–1960
 Alaric Jans (born 1949), American film and theater composer
 Alaric Tay (born 1979), Singaporean director, producer and actor
 Alaric Tokpa, politician in Liberia
 Alaric Alexander Watts (1797–1864), British poet and journalist
 Juan Pujol García (1912–10 October 1988), codenamed Alaric by Nazi Germany while working as a double-agent spy for Great Britain

Fictional characters
 Alaric, in the novels of Phyllis Eisenstein
 Alaric Morgan, in the Deryni series of historical fantasy novels by Katherine Kurtz
 Alaric Saltzman, in The Vampire Diaries
 Alaric Stark, in the fantasy novel Fire & Blood written by George R. R. Martin

See also
 Alarico Fernandes, Timorese politician and independence activist
 Eric

Germanic given names
Masculine given names